Hurufism ( ḥurūfiyyah, Persian: حُروفیان hōrufiyān)  was a Sufi movement based on the mysticism of letters (ḥurūf), which originated in Astrabad and spread to areas of western Iran (Persia) and Anatolia in the late 14th and early 15th centuries.

Foundation 
The founder and spiritual head of the Hurufi movement was Fazlallah Astarabadi (1340–94). Born in Astrabad (now Gorgan, Iran), he was strongly drawn to Sufism and the teachings of Mansur Al-Hallaj and Rumi at an early age. In the mid-1370s, Fazlallah started to propagate his teachings all over Iran and Azerbaijan. While living in Tabriz, Fazlallah gained an elite following in the court of the Jalairid Sultanate. At that time, Fazlallah was still in the mainstream of Sufi tradition. Later, he did move towards more esoteric spirituality, and, failing to convert Timur, was executed in 1394 near Alinja Tower in Nakhchivan by the ruler's son, Miran Shah. The large uprising of Hurufis was crushed, but the popular movement survived for another decade or so in different guises.

Fazlallah's greatest work was the Jāvdānnāme-ye kabir ("Great Book of Eternity"), likely written in Baku before his arrest, which survived due to its dissemination due to copies made by his daughter Makhdumzāde. It was largely preserved in popular culture due to its use by dervishes of the Bektashi Order.

Key elements 
According to Fazlallah, the key to open the seventh sealed book, the Qurʾan, is a kabbalistic system of letters that is expounded by later Hurufis in the Hidayat Namah, Jawidan and in the Mahram Namah. The Universe is eternal and moves by rotation. Divine countenance is imperishable and is manifest in Man, the best of forms, zuhur kibriya. God is incarnated in every atom. Hurufis considered Fazlallah Astarabadi a manifestation of God's force after Adam, Moses and Muhammad. God is also embodied in words and the 28 letters of the Arabic alphabet, and the 32 letters of the Persian alphabet are the basis for love and beauty in the world. Seven is a key number corresponding to noble parts of the face, the verses of Al-Fatiha and verbal confession of faith. Man is a supreme copy of the divine and the key to haqiqa’’.

According to R. N. Frye's The Cambridge History of Iran, Hurufism was an expression of Isma'ilism in its mystical identification of the human figure but differed in its recognition of haqiqa in the substance of letters rather than in the person of the Imam.

 Impact 
 
After Fazlallah's death his ideas were further developed and propagated by Imadaddin Nasimi and the "certain accursed ones of no significance" in Azerbaijan and Seyid Ishag in Turkey. The poet Imadaddin Nasimi (?–1417) and other Hurufis make kabbalistic tendencies subordinate to mystic concepts of Sufism, and specifically those of Mansur Al-Hallaj, who was another great influence on Imadaddin Nasimi.

Through Nasimi's poetry Hurufi ideas influenced, to different degrees, people like Niyaz-i Misri, Fuzûlî, Habibi, Ismail I, and Rushani. The Bektashi Order, which is  still active in Anatolia and the Balkans, was a repository for the Hurufi teachings and writings.  One of Fazlallah's personal students, Rafî'î, emigrated into the Balkans. He transmitted a central thesis of Hurufism, that the cardinalities of the Arabic and Persian alphabet respectively enumerate all types of shape and sound, by axes of symmetry. A Hurufi rebellion in Kwarezem was suppressed by the Mongols, and that motivated the exodus of Hurufis to the Balkans. The Bektashi manuscripts show almost 500 years of Hurufism in the Balkans, with a peak in the 1700s. Other Sufi orders, such as the Qadiriyya and the Naqshbandi, contributed in the collection, retrieval, and translation of Hurufi manuscripts.

Hurufi manuscripts
From the Balkans, a great number of records were recorded in what is today Albania, but the relation between Bektashism and Hurufism is evidenced from Greek transcriptions. In total, many of the Hurufi manuscripts that are existent today were safeguarded in the libraries of Bektashi lodges, including Fadl’Allah Yazdânî’s Cāvidān-Nāma, Shaykh Sāfî’s Hākikāt-Nāma, Ali’ûl-A’lâ’s Māhşar-Nāma, Amîr Gıyâs’ad-Dîn’s  İstivâ-Nāme, Frişte Oğlu’s Ahirat-Nāma, and some other books written on "Hurufi Theology" like Aşık-Nāma, Hidāyat-Nāma, Mukāddama’t-ûl-Hākayık, Muhārram-Nāma-i Sayyid İshāk, Nihāyat-Nāma, Tûrāb-Nāma, Miftāh’ûl-Gayb, Tuhfat’ûl-Uşşak, Risâla-i Noktā, Risāle-i Hurûf, Risāla-i Fāzl’ûl-Lah, and Risāla-i Virān Abdāl. Hurufi terms and concepts permeate Bektāshi poetry. Gül Baba provided an extensive compendium of Hurufi ideas in The Key to the Unseen.

 In contemporary culture 

 
 The scenes of Fazlallah's execution and of Nasimi's brutal flailing in Aleppo appear in the Azeri language movie Nasimi (1973).
 Hurufism plays a role in Turkish author Orhan Pamuk's novel The Black Book.
 Hurufism also plays a role in Ian McDonald's futuristic novel, The Dervish House.

 See also 
Abjad numerals
Ahmed Lur
Arabic alphabet
Arabic numerals
Báb
Eastern Arabic numerals
Ideas of reference and delusions of reference 
'Ilm al-Huruf
Isma'ilism
Kabbalah, a Jewish movement finding secret meanings in Hebrew letters.
List of extinct Shia sects
Mahmoud Pasikhani
Murād Mīrzā
Nuqtavi
One Dimension Group

 References 

 External links 
Encyclopedia Iranica, HORUFISM
Encyclopedia Iranica, JĀVDĀN-NĀMA, the major work of Fażl-Allāh Astarābādi
Encyclopedia Iranica, ASTARĀBĀDĪ, FAŻLALLĀH (d. 796/1394), founder of the Ḥorūfī sect.
Encyclopedia Iranica, ʿALĪ AL-AʿLĀ (d. 822/1419), also known as Amīr Sayyed ʿAlī, principal successor of Fażlallāh Astarābādī.

 Further reading 
Abdülbâki Gölpınarlı (Ed.), Hurûfilik Metinleri Kataloğu, XII. Dizi- Sa. 6a TTK, 1989.
 Fazlullah Esterâbâdî, Câvidannâme; Dürr-i Yetim İsimli Tercümesi, haz. Fatih Usluer, İstanbul, Kabalci Yayınevi, 2012.
 H.T. Norris "The Hurufi Legacy of Fadlullah of Astarabad", in Heritage of Sufism, 2003. Oxford, One World
 Shahzad Bashir Fazlallah Astarabadi and the Hurufis'', Oneworld Publications (May 25, 2005)
 Fatih Usluer, "Le Houroufisme. La doctrine et son influence dans la littérature persane et ottomane", EPHE-Paris, PhD Thesis, 2007.
 Fatih Usluer, "Hurufilik", Kabalcı Yayınevi, 2009
 Fatih Usluer, "Misâlî'nin Miftâhu’l Gayb'ı Metin ve Açıklama", Turkish Studies, International Periodical for the Languages, Literature and History of Turkish or Turkic, Volume 2/2, Spring, S. 2, www.turkishstudies.net, (Ed. Prof. Dr. Gurer Gulsevin, Dr. Mehmet Dursun Erdem), pp. 697–722.
 Fatih Usluer, "Hurûfî Metinleri ile İlgili Bazı Notlar", Ege Üniversitesi Türk Dili ve Edebiyatı Araştırmaları Dergisi, S. 13, Ocak/Jan 2007.
 Fatih Usluer, "Nesîmî Şiirlerinin Şerhlerinde Yapılan Yanlışlıklar," Turkish Studies, International Periodical for the Languages, Literature and History of Turkish or Turkic, Volume 4/2,Winter, 2009, Wayback Machine, ss. 1072–1091.
 Fatih Usluer, "Mir Fâzılî’nin Taksîm-i Salât u Evkât’ının Şerhi", Hacı Bektaş Veli Dergisi, Volume 50, ss. 145–222. Wayback Machine
 Rıfkı Melul Meriç, HURUFİLİK, Dil Tarih Coğrafya Fakültesi Basılmamış Mezuniyet Tezi, Ankara, 1935.
 Fatih Usluer, "Hurûfî Şifreleri", Journal of Turkish Studies, Volume 33/II, ss. 201–219.
 Fatih Usluer, "Hurufilikte On İki İmam", Turkish Studies, International Periodical for the Languages, Literature and History of Turkish or Turkic, Volume 5/1, Winter, ss. 1361–1389. 
 Fatih Usluer, "Hurufism Among Albanian Bektashis", The Journal of International Social Research, Volume III/15, ss. 268–280.
 Fatih Usluer, "Feyznâme-i Misâlî Neşirleri", Hacı Bektaş Veli Dergisi, Volume 56, ss. 299–323.
 Fatih Usluer, "Hurufilikte Rüya Tabirleri", Milli Folklor, Vol. 90, ss. 134–146.
 Fatih Usluer, "Les Themes Bibliques chez les Houroufis", Ishraq, Vol. II, ss. 426–443.

Sufi philosophy
Sufism
Islamic mysticism
Shia Sufi orders
Hurufi
Hermeticism
Language and mysticism